Avoca is a rural locality in the local government areas (LGA) of Northern Midlands (99%) and Break O'Day (1%) in the Central and North-east LGA regions of Tasmania. The 2021 census recorded a population of 192 for Avoca.

Avoca is situated on the banks of the South Esk River near the confluence of the St. Paul's river in the parish of Avoca and county of Cornwall, and was first settled in the 1830s. It was originally named St. Paul's Plains by John Helder Wedge during a 1833 survey of the area. The area was officially settled in 1834 as a farming, coal and tin mining village.

History 
Avoca is a confirmed locality.

In the 19th century, the town had a small Anglican church (St. Thomas', designed by James Blackburn), a school, and a police station. St. Paul's river was crossed by a small stone bridge. St. Paul's Plains Post Office opened on 1 June 1832 and was renamed Avoca in 1837.

Today, mines in the area have closed and Avoca serves only as a farming community.

Geography
Almost all the boundaries are survey lines. The South Esk River flows through from north-east to south-west.

Road infrastructure 
Route A4 (Esk Main Road) runs through from south-west to north-east.

Landmarks

A number of historic buildings exist in the small town, including the St Thomas Anglican Church completed on 8 May 1842, the parish hall completed around 1850, and the Union Hotel built in 1842. Nearby locations include Rossarden, Fingal and Storys Creek.

References

Towns in Tasmania
Populated places established in the 19th century
Localities of Northern Midlands Council
Localities of Break O'Day Council